Tieghemella heckelii (also called baku or cherry mahogany) is a tree species of the genus Tieghemella in the plant family Sapotaceae. The species occurs in Cameroon, Ivory Coast, Gabon, Ghana, Liberia, Nigeria, and Sierra Leone and is threatened by habitat loss and over exploitation. This timber tree species can grow up to 45 meters tall and 1.2 meters in diameter.

References

heckelii
Endangered plants
Taxonomy articles created by Polbot
Taxa named by Auguste Chevalier